pyMPI is a software project that integrates the Message Passing Interface (MPI) into the Python interpreter.

It allows one to write parallel programs using the Python language.

It has not been updated since 2013-04-17.

Example of usage
This python program:
 $ mpirun -np 3 pyMPI
 > import mpi
 > print "Hi, I'm process #%d" % mpi.rank

will print this output:

 Hi, I'm process #0
 Hi, I'm process #1
 Hi, I'm process #2

The -np parameter given to mpirun tells mpi to use 3 processes, and each process in its turn prints its output on the screen.

References

External links
 

Python (programming language) software